St. John Township is one of eleven townships in Lake County, Indiana. As of the 2010 census, its population was 66,741 and it contained 25,691 housing units.

History
St. John Township was established in 1848. It was named for John Hack, the first German settler.

Geography

The township includes the towns of Dyer, Schererville and St. John as well as the unincorporated areas of these towns.

Zip codes in the township include 46307, 46311, 46319, 46373, and 46375.  The State House districts are IN-11 and IN-15, and the State Senate districts are IN-1, IN-6, and a small portion of IN-2.

Demographics 
The racial makeup of the township is 82.1% non-Hispanic White, 11.3% Hispanic, 2.73% African American, 2.23% Asian, 0.58% from other races, and 1.13% from two or more races.  The percentages of Hispanic and African American residents are, respectively, 5.4 and 22.6 percent lower than Lake County as a whole.

Native-born citizens make up 91.9% of the population.  Naturalized citizens are 5.3% of the population, while 1.9% are not citizens.  The top ten countries of birth for foreign-born residents are Mexico, India, Croatia, Poland, Serbia, Greece, Macedonia, Philippines, Germany, and Bosnia and Herzegovina.  The most common self-reported ancestries are: German (23.1%), Polish (17%), Irish (15.9%), Mexican (8.72%), Unclassified/Unreported (8.5%), Italian (8.1%), English (7.3%), Dutch (5.6%), American (4.7%), and Serbian (2.8%).

References

External links
 Indiana Township Association
 United Township Association of Indiana

Townships in Lake County, Indiana
Townships in Indiana
populated places established in 1848
1848 establishments in Indiana